Hofkirchen Airfield is a recreational aerodrome,  west of Hofkirchen im Traunkreis, Oberösterreich, Austria.

See also
List of airports in Austria

References

External links 
 Airport record for Hofkirchen Airport at Landings.com

Airports in Austria
Upper Austria